The International Association of Press Clubs (IAPC) is an international collaborative chain of national organisations (Press Clubs and FCCs) which support the professional endeavours of its members and the principle of a free press.

Freedom of Speech Award
Reporters Without Borders received the first IAPC Freedom of Speech Award in 2013 for their "outstanding contributions to the defense or the struggle for freedom of expression, the creation of conditions to support freedom of speech."

Members organizations
 National Press Club of Australia (Canberra, Australia)
 Press Club Concordia (Vienna, Austria)
 Press Club Brussels Europe (Brussels, Belgium)
 Maison de la Presse de Liege et de Luxembourg (Liege, Belgium)
 Foreign Correspondents’ Club of China (Beijing, China)
 Shanghai Foreign Correspondents’ Club (Shanghai, China)
 International Press Club of Prague (Prague, Czech Republic)
 Press Club de France (Paris, France)
 Club de la Presse de Bordeaux (Bordeaux Cedex, France)
 Club de la Presse de Lyon (Lyon, France)
 Club de la Presse de Montpellier (Montpellier, France)
 Club de la Presse de Strasbourg (Strasbourg, France)
 Club de la Presse Nord-Pas de Calais (Lille Cedex, France)
 Berliner Presse Club (Berlin, Germany)
 Frankfurter PresseClub (Frankfurt, Germany)
 International Press Club of Munich (Munich, Germany)
 London Press Club (London, Great Britain)
 Foreign Correspondents’ Club of Hong Kong (Hong Kong, Hong Kong)
 Foreign Correspondents’ Club of South Asia (New Delhi, India)
 Press Club of India (New Delhi, India)
 Jakarta Foreign Correspondents Club (Jakarta, Indonesia)
 Jerusalem Press Club (Jerusalem, Israel)
 Circolo della Stampa Milano (Milan, Italy)
 Japan National Press Club (Tokyo, Japan)
 Foreign Correspondents' Club of Japan (Tokyo, Japan)
 Foreign Correspondents Club of Malaysia (Kuala Lumpur, Malaysia)
 National Press Club of Mongolia (Ulaanbaatar, Mongolia)
 National Press Club of Nepal (Lalitpur, Nepal)
 Internationaal Perscentrum Nieuwspoort (Den Haag, Netherlands)
 National Press Club of New Zealand (Wellington, New Zealand)
 Press Club Polska (Warsaw, Poland)
 Polish Club of International Columnists (Warsaw, Poland)
 Clube de Jornalistas (Lisbon, Portugal)
 Foreign Correspondents Association of Singapore (Singapore, Singapore)
 Singapore Press Club (Singapore, Singapore)
 Seoul Foreign Correspondents’ Club (Seoul, South Korea)
 Geneva Press Club (Le Club Suisse de la presse, or  Swiss Press Club) (Geneva, Switzerland)
 Foreign Correspondents Club of Thailand (Bangkok, Thailand)
 Overseas Press Club of America (New York, United States of America)

References

External links 
IAPC official website

Press clubs
Foreign correspondents' clubs
International journalism organizations
Freedom of expression organizations
International professional associations
International organisations based in Poland